Lạc Dương is a township (thị trấn) and capital of Lạc Dương District, Lâm Đồng Province, Vietnam.

References

Populated places in Lâm Đồng province
Communes of Lâm Đồng province
District capitals in Vietnam
Townships in Vietnam